John S. Gobin is an American six-goal polo player.

Early life
John S. Gobin grew up in Rehoboth, Massachusetts. He began playing arena polo in interscholastic competitions at the age of fifteen. From the age of seventeen to nineteen, he trained to become a polo player in Argentina.

Polo
He began his career by playing with polo patron Geoffrey Kent, the founder of Abercrombie & Kent. He then played on the Budweiser Polo Team. He is now a six-goal polo player.

He won the Westchester Cup alongside Adam Snow, Owen Rinehart and Robert E. Walton at the Guards Polo Club in England in 1992. He won the Camacho Cup on the American team against Mexico in 2009. He has competed on several USA Teams including for the International Polo Tour global polo matches and Team USA against Argentina. He has also played on the Duck Hill Polo Team at the Aiken Polo Club in Aiken, South Carolina. He has also won the U.S. Arena Championships four times and competed on the United States Polo Team against Italy in the America's Polo Cup winning the world cup in 2011. Today he plays on the IPT TEAM USA sponsored by Celebrity Cruises & Hotels at Sea global polo programs.

He has been the manager of the Great Meadow Polo Club in The Plains, Fauquier County, Virginia since 2007.

Personal life
He winters in Wellington, Florida, and summers in The Plains, Virginia. He also owns the Four Oaks Farm in Aiken, South Carolina. His wife, Kathleen, is an equine veterinarian. They have a daughter.

References

Living people
People from Rehoboth, Massachusetts
People from Wellington, Florida
Sportspeople from Aiken, South Carolina
People from The Plains, Virginia
American polo players
Year of birth missing (living people)